Joseph (Joe) Sarkis (born 1949) is a Lebanese politician and former minister of tourism.

He is a prominent member of the Lebanese Forces. From 1988 to 1994 he was member of the Kataeb Political Bureau. He distanced himself from that party after its leadership took a pro-Syrian stance. He became an activist in the Lebanese Forces despite it being banned. In 1998, he was elected to the municipal council of Beirut as the Lebanese Forces representative. In 2002, he became the Lebanese Forces official responsible for Beirut.

Sarkis is a civil engineer with a degree from the Ecole Supérieure des Ingénieurs de Beyrouth.

External links
www.joesarkis.com
Sarkis: "I can't believe a Maronite Christian assaulted Sfeir
CV of Joe Sarkis in Arab Decision Site
Interview about Hezbollah-Israel confrontation

1949 births
Living people
Lebanese Forces politicians
Kataeb Party politicians
Government ministers of Lebanon